Michael Hansen may refer to:

 Michael Hansen (footballer) (born 1971), Danish football midfielder
 Michael Hansen (sailor) (born 1990), Danish competitive sailor
 Michael E. Hansen, chief executive officer of Cengage Learning
 Michael Sahl Hansen (born 1978), Danish handball player
 Manse (DJ) (Michael Hansen), Swedish DJ and record producer
 Michael Hansen, motorcycle producer, see Hansen & Schneider (motorcycle)

See also
 Michael Hansson (disambiguation)